Eisenia is a genus of earthworms (annelids), named after Swedish scientist Gustav Eisen.

References

Lumbricidae
Annelid genera